Achille Bonito Oliva (born 1939) is an Italian art critic and historian of contemporary art. Since 1968 he has taught history of contemporary art at La Sapienza, the university of Rome. He has written extensively on contemporary art and contemporary artists; he originated the term Transavanguardia to describe the new direction taken in the late 1970s by artists such as Sandro Chia, Francesco Clemente, Enzo Cucchi, Nicola De Maria, and Mimmo Paladino. He has organised or curated numerous contemporary art events and exhibitions; in 1993 he was artistic director of the Biennale di Venezia.

Life and career 

Bonito Oliva was born in 1939 in Caggiano, in the province of Salerno, in Campania in southern Italy. He studied law, and then took a degree in letters. He took part in events connected with the avant-garde Gruppo 63 literary movement of the 1960s.

In 1968 he began teaching history of contemporary art at La Sapienza, the university of Rome.

He became active as an art critic, as a writer on history of art – with work on Mannerism, the historic Avant-Garde movements, and the Neo-Avantgarde – and as an organiser and curator of contemporary art events and exhibitions.

Bonito Oliva has curated thematic and interdisciplinary exhibitions, including "Contemporanea" (Villa Borghese, Rome, 1974), "Aperto 1980" (together with Harald Szeemann, Venice Biennale, 1980), "Avanguardia Transavanguardia" (Mura Aureliane, Rome, 1982), "'Mythe, Drame, Tragedie", Musée d'Art et d'Industrie, Paris (1982), "Art and Depression" (Museo Correr, Venice, 1984), and "Minimalia" (P.S.1 Contemporary Art Center, New York, 1998). He directed the 45th Venice Biennale (1993), the 3rd Dakar Biennale (1998), the 1st Valencia Biennale (2001), and was the curator of the Italian Pavilion at the 7th Paris Biennale (1971). He has been awarded several prizes and recognitions, including the Valentino d’Oro, an international prize for art critics, in 1991.

In about 1978 he coined the term Transavanguardia to describe the work of artists such as Sandro Chia, Francesco Clemente, Enzo Cucchi, Nicola De Maria and Mimmo Paladino, who – in a manner comparable to that of the Neo-Expressionists and the Neue Wilden – discarded the abstract and conceptual approach of the Neo-Avantgarde and instead returned to figurative painting using the traditional techniques and materials, and at times also the forms and motifs, of the past. Bonito Oliva curated an exhibition of their work at the Biennale di Venezia in 1980.

Books 

Bonito Oliva has written many books, including monographs on artists such as Marina Abramović, Francis Bacon, Georg Baselitz, Joseph Beuys, Alighiero Boetti, James Lee Byars, Giorgio de Chirico, Braco Dimitrijević, Marcel Duchamp, Giuseppe Ducrot, Alex Katz, Georgia O'Keeffe, Frida Kahlo, Paul Klee, Nam June Paik, Joan Miró, Pino Pascali, Jackson Pollock, Robert Rauschenberg, Mario Schifano, Nancy Spero, Andy Warhol, Wolf Vostell, and Robert Wilson.

As author 

 Made in mater. Bologna: Sampietro, 1967
 Il territorio magico. Comportamenti alternativi dell'arte. Firenze: Centro Di, 1971
 Arte e sistema dell'arte. Opera, pubblico, critica, mercato. Pescara: Galleria Lucrezia De Domizio, 1975
 Disegno. Trasparenza. Pollenza: La nuovo foglio, 1976
 L'ideologia del traditore. Arte, maniera, manierismo. Milano: Feltrinelli, 1976
 Vita di Marcel Duchamp. Roma: Marani, 1976
 Europe/America. The different avant-gardes. Milano: Deco Press, 1976
 Autocritico automobile attraverso le avanguardie. Milano: Il Formichiere, 1977
 Passo dello strabismo. Sulle arti. Milano: Feltrinelli, 1978
 Arcimboldo. Parma: Franco Maria Ricci, 1978
 La Transavanguardia italiana. Milano: Politi, 1980
 Il sogno dell'arte. Tra avanguardia e transavanguardia. Milano: Spirali, 1981
 La Transavanguardia Internazionale. Milano: Politi, 1982
 Manuale di volo. [Dal mito greco all'arte moderna, dalle avanguardie storiche alla transavanguardia]. Milano: Feltrinelli, 1982
 Dialoghi d'artista. Incontri con l'arte contemporanea 1970-1984. Milano: Electa, 1984
 Minori Maniere. Dal Cinquecento alla Transavanguardia. Milano: Feltrinelli, 1985
 Progetto dolce. Nuove forme dell'arte italiana. Milano: Nuova Prearo, 1986
 Antipatia. L'arte contemporanea. Milano: Feltrinelli, 1987
 Superarte. Milano: Politi, 1988
 Il tallone di Achille. Sull'arte contemporanea. Milano: Feltrinelli, 1988
  Arte Lago 90, opere d’arte per la superficie acquatica. [Varese]: Lativa, 1990
 L'arte fino al 2000. Firenze: Sansoni, 1991
 Artae. Milano: Prearo, 1991
 Wolf Vostell, L'Arte e lo Stile Della Conflittualità. Roma: Edizioni Carte Segrete, 1992
 Conversation pieces. Torino: Allemandi, 1993
 La dimora dei corpi gravi. Tributo a Masaccio. Milano: Charta, 1994
 Lezioni di anatomia. Il corpo dell'arte. Roma: Kappa, 1995
 Oggetti di turno. Dall'arte alla critica. Venezia: Marsilio, 1997
 A.B.O.: M.D.. Milano: Costa & Nolan, 1997
 Gratis. A bordo dell'arte. Milano: Skira, 2000
 Fathi Hassan. Milano: Charta, 2000
 L'arte oltre il 2000. Firenze: Sansoni, 2002
 Autocritico automobile. Attraverso le avanguardie. Remake per le nuove generazioni. Latina: Cooper & Castelvecchi, 2002
 I fuochi dello sguardo. Musei che reclamano attenzione. Roma: Gangemi, 2004
 Lezione di boxe. Dieci round sull'arte contemporanea. Roma: Sossella, 2004
 Il bianco e altro e comunque arte. Torino: Umberto Allemandi, 2006
 Claudio Abate, fotografo: installation et performance art. Milano: Photology, 2007

As editor 
 Autonomia e creatività della critica. Cosenza: Lerici, 1980
 Paul Klee. L'annunciazione del segno. Disegni e acquarelli. Milano: G. Mazzotta, 1982
 Avanguardia/Transavanguardia. Milano: Electa, 1982
 Desideretur. Artisti italiani giovanissimi nel Palazzo della Ragione. Bergamo, settembre-ottobre 1985. Roma: Spazio Skema, 1985
 La transavanguardia italiana. Sandro Chia, Francesco Clemente, Enzo Cucchi, Nicola De Maria, Mimmo Paladino. Roma: Drago Arts & Communication, 2003

References 

Italian art critics
Italian art curators
Living people
Recipients of the Italian Order of Merit for Culture and Art
Gruppo 63
1939 births
Venice Biennale artistic directors
Transavanguardia